An aircraft station (also aircraft radio station) is – according to Article 1.83 of the International Telecommunication Union's (ITU) ITU Radio Regulations (RR) – defined as "A mobile radio station in the aeronautical mobile service, other than survival craft station, located on board an aircraft".

Each station shall be classified by the service in which it operates permanently or temporarily.

See also 

Selection of UHF/VHF aircraft stations

References / sources 

 International Telecommunication Union (ITU)

Airbands
 
Air traffic control
Avionics